Frank Gavin may refer to:

 Francis Gavin, professor of political science at MIT
 Frank S. B. Gavin (1890–1938), American Anglican priest and theologian